King of Fools is a studio album by British Christian rock band Delirious?, initially released in June 1997. The full-length project showcased a new mainstream sound, whilst retaining many of the core themes found in their Cutting Edge EPs. Stylistically, the album epitomises the band's similarity to U2, an influence which was highlighted by several critics on release. King of Fools reached No. 13 in the UK album chart, a career high for the band, and produced four singles. The second, "Deeper", peaked at No. 20 on the UK singles chart on 11 May 1997. It also includes what is possibly the best known Delirious? song, "History Maker", which the band regularly played live throughout their whole career. The album was listed at No. 85 in the 2001 book, CCM Presents: The 100 Greatest Albums in Christian Music. The album was nominated for a Grammy.

Background 
Delirious? were originally known as "The Cutting Edge Band" before 1996. They played regularly at the "Cutting Edge" Christian events held in their hometown of Littlehampton. In August 1995, a major car accident involving lead singer Martin Smith, his wife, and bassist Jon Thatcher, left the former was badly injured. The song "August 30th" was inspired by these events. Smith went through a period of depression, before being partly inspired by Bill Flanagan's book U2: At the End of the World, which he read in hospital, to take the band full-time. The members of the band decided to resign from their respective jobs and become professional musicians. Delirious? soon began working on songs for their first full studio album.

Recording and release 
After making their first release as Delirious?, a live album titled Live & In the Can, the band set up recording equipment in Beltwood House, London. The album was recorded between 1 December 1996 and 28 January 1997 using an Otari Radar. The album was produced by Andy Piercy, who had previously produced the band's four Cutting Edge EPs. After the release of two singles, the latter of which, "Deeper", stayed in the UK singles charts for three weeks running, the band released the full-length album to the UK market in June 1997. After this, Delirious? took part in an extensive promotional campaign which included playing to 50,000 fans at London's Wembley Stadium, and an appearance on Channel 4's The Big Breakfast programme. The record charted at No. 13 in the UK charts, having held the midweek position of No. 10. It dropped to No. 58 in its second week, before charting at No. 70 in its third week.

In 2007, the band took the decision to re-release some of their earlier albums as two-disc 'fuse boxes'. One of these albums included King of Fools, which was paired with the 1996 live album, Live & In the Can.

Singles 
The album spawned four singles. The band released their very first mainstream single in the UK during February 1997, several months before the release of the album. "White Ribbon Day" was a song inspired by the political situation occurring in Northern Ireland at the time. Distribution problems partly led to the single charting at No. 41, meaning that it narrowly missed out on the UK Top 40 chart show on BBC Radio 1. However, "White Ribbon Day" remained in the top 75 for a second week, charting at No. 75.

In May, the band released "Deeper", their highest selling single. The song charted at No. 20, and BBC Radio 1 dubbed the band "pop's best kept secret". "Deeper" remained in the top 40 for a second week, charting at No. 39. It remained in the charts for a third week, charting at No. 65 before dropping out of the charts completely by the end of the month.

The band chose to plan a third single after the June release of the album. In July, "Promise" was released as a two-disc set. This technique, aimed at boosting sales, was frequently used by the band after this. The single entered the charts at No. 20, before dropping to No. 48 in its second week.

During their November UK tour, Delirious? promoted a re-release of "Deeper", which arrived in the form of a four track EP. The DeEPer EP only narrowly scraped into the UK top 40, charting at No. 36 during its first week, before dropping to No. 69 in the second.

Music videos were filmed for "Deeper" and "Promise" to coincide with their respective single releases.

Reception 

King of Fools was positively received by both mainstream and CCM publications. Crosswalk praised the album, stating "...if you're looking for something tame and lacking originality, you're in the wrong place!" Cross Rhythms rated the album as ten out of ten, and argued that it showed the "...versitility of the band." Jesus Freak Hideout called it "...an overlooked but excellent musical achievement." Many critics noticed the U2 influences on the record. MTV noted that "King of Fools has echoes of '80s U2, but the band accentuates the Christian undertones in Bono's lyrics, creating a modern rock record that resonates with spirituality." HM Magazine called the project "the U2 album fans have been waiting for..."

Tour 
Delirious? supported the album by launching a ten date tour of the United Kingdom during October and November 1997. Titled the 'd:tour', shows sold out at venues in Folkestone, Leicester, Grimsby, Manchester, London, Leeds, Wolverhampton, Cornwall and Exeter before finishing in front of a packed crowd in Southampton Guildhall, near the band's hometown of Littlehampton. The gigs were advertised every morning by Virgin Radio during their 'gig guide'. The Southampton gig was recorded as a live album, d:tour, and a live video, "A View from the Terraces". Both projects were released in 1998.

Track listing 

Note
The American re-release adds a remix of "Louder than the Radio" between "Hands of Kindness" and "White Ribbon Day".

Personnel 
Delirious?
 Martin Smith – lead vocals, guitars
 Stu Garrard – guitars, backing vocals
 Tim Jupp – keyboards, Hammond organ, backing vocals 
 Jon Thatcher – bass, backing vocals 
 Stew Smith – drums, percussion, backing vocals 

Additional personnel
 Mike Roberts – loops and programming (2, 3, 5, 10, 11)
 Mark Edwards – loops and programming (9)
 Gerard Le Feuvre – cello (1, 4, 10, 11, 12)
 Paul Kimber – double bass (1, 4, 10, 11, 12)
 Sebastian Fenton – viola (1, 4, 10, 11, 12)
 Sarah Robson – viola (1, 4, 10, 11, 12)
 Nick Evans-Pughe – violin (1, 4, 10, 11, 12)
 Jonathan Josephs – violin (1, 4, 10, 11, 12)
 Rosalind McIntosh – violin (1, 4, 10, 11, 12)
 Delirious? – string arrangements (1, 4, 10, 11, 12)
 Richard Swan – string arrangements (1, 4, 10, 11, 12), choir arrangements and conductor (3, 9, 12)
 The Tehilla! Choir – backing vocals (3, 9, 12) 
 Jussy McLean – backing vocals (5)

Production
 Andy Piercy – producer
 Delirious? – producers, engineers, mixing, album design 
 Danny Bowater – assistant engineer
 Paul Burton – assistant engineer, live sound technician 
 Mike Roberts – assistant engineer
 Ray Staff – mastering at Whitfield Street Studios. London, UK
 Andy Hutch – photography

Charts

Album

Singles

References

Delirious? albums
1997 albums